Dazopride (AHR-5531) is an antiemetic and gastroprokinetic agent of the benzamide class which was never marketed. It acts as a 5-HT3 receptor antagonist and 5-HT4 receptor agonist. In addition to its gastrointestinal effects, dazopride facilitates learning and memory in mice.

See also 
 Antiemetic
 Benzamide

References 

Serotonin receptor agonists
5-HT3 antagonists
Antiemetics
Salicylamide ethers
Anilines
Chlorobenzenes
Pyrazolidines